Mitchell High School is a small public high school located in Mitchell, Indiana, United States.

History

The graded public school system was first utilized in Mitchell in 1869. Ten years later, the Emerson School was built on 8th Street. Emerson was used as Mitchell's high school until 1903.

In 1903, Mitchell received a new high school named Riley. This was used as the high school until a new high school was built next to the Emerson building in 1916.

The 1916 building received additions in 1922, 1940, and 1949. The old Emerson was torn down in 1927 and a new Emerson Elementery and gym were built in its place.

In May 1960, a fire destroyed the 1916 building and the 1922 addition. A new building was completed in time for the 1962 to 1963 school year. This building is still used today as the community's high school.
Mitchell High School is accredited by the North Central Association of Colleges and Schools. It serves more than 500 students in grades nine through twelve.

Curriculum
Students may earn the Indiana Honors Diploma, and college credits through Indiana Reform Institute in chemistry, language arts, calculus, and psychology.

Extracurricular activities
Student groups and activities include Art Club, Key Club, Chemistry club, Fellowship of Christian Athletes, French Club, Spanish Club, Book Club, student council, and Students Against Destructive Decisions. SADD is the school's largest extracurricular activity. The Mitchell High School band, called the Marching Blue Jackets, play at every home football and basketball game.

Athletics
Mitchell's athletic teams compete in the Patoka Lake Conference and the Indiana High School Athletic Association (IHSAA). In the 2015-17 athletic seasons the Jackets competed in 2A competition in all sports, Cross country, wrestling and track and field do not have a class set-up in the state of Indiana.

Mitchell's athletic teams have won more than 30 conference titles, 36 Sectional championships, five Regional crowns, and State Finals appearances in boys' basketball (1940), girls' volleyball (2001), boys' cross country (2005), and most recently girls' basketball (2007).

Notable alumni
 Terry Cole - former NFL running back
 Gus Grissom - former NASA astronaut and Second American to fly in Space
 Chase Briscoe - NASCAR Cup Series driver
 Ashley Yoder - UFC fighter

See also
 List of high schools in Indiana

References

External links
 Mitchell High School

Public high schools in Indiana
Education in Lawrence County, Indiana
1869 establishments in Indiana